Wrestle Sekigahara was a professional wrestling event promoted by CyberFight's sub-brand Ganbare☆Pro-Wrestling (GanPro). It took place on July 10, 2022, in Tokyo, Japan, at the Ota City General Gymnasium. The event aired live on CyberAgent's streaming service Wrestle Universe. This was the first event held by GanPro in this arena and it is regarded as being the largest event produced by the brand as of date.

Production

Background
Ganbare☆Pro-Wrestling (GanPro) was founded in 2013 by Ken Ohka as a sub-brand of DDT Pro-Wrestling. In 2020, when DDT and Pro Wrestling Noah merged into CyberFight, GanPro and DDT's joshi sub-brand TJPW began being promoted as sister promotions under the CyberFight umbrella.

Impact of the COVID-19 pandemic
As a result of the COVID-19 pandemic, audiences at pro-wrestling shows had been asked to refrain from emitting vocal noises and limit their interactions to applause. In July 2022, during a press conference, CyberFight announced that those restrictions would be lifted starting with the TJPW event Summer Sun Princess 2022 on July 9.

Storylines
The event featured eight professional wrestling matches that resulted from scripted storylines, where wrestlers portrayed villains, heroes, or less distinguishable characters in the scripted events that built tension and culminated in a wrestling match or series of matches.

On July 5, GanPro announced the signing of a new female talent, the identity of which will be revealed at the event.

Matches

Notes

References

External links
The official Ganbare☆Pro-Wrestling website

CyberAgent
2022 in professional wrestling
July 2022 events in Japan
Events in Tokyo
Professional wrestling in Tokyo